M/E/A/N/I/N/G was an art publication for dissenting viewpoints. Founded in 1986 by Susan Bee and Mira Schor as a magazine for and by artists, it was first published in New York in December, 1986.

Written by artists, the magazine focused on the visual arts. It emphasized feminism and painting, while also including essays by poets. Edited by Schor and Bee, there were  20 issues during the period of 1986 to 1996. The magazine was published online from 2001-2016.  M/E/A/N/I/N/G: An Anthology of Artists' Writings, was published by Duke University Press in 2000; it included selections from the magazine and includes essays and commentary by artists, critics, and poets.

References

External links
 

Defunct  women's magazines published in the United States
English-language magazines
Feminism in New York City
Feminist magazines
Magazines established in 1986
Magazines established in 1996
Magazines published in New York City
Online magazines with defunct print editions
Visual arts magazines published in the United States